Stachylina is a genus of fungi in the Harpellaceae family. The widespread genus contains 29 species that grow in Diptera.

Species
Stachylina acutibasilaris
Stachylina ceratopogonidarum
Stachylina chironomidarum
Stachylina dolichospora
Stachylina euthena
Stachylina grandispora
Stachylina gravicaudata
Stachylina jujuyensis
Stachylina lentica
Stachylina litoralis
Stachylina longa
Stachylina lotica
Stachylina macrospora
Stachylina magna
Stachylina manicata
Stachylina minima
Stachylina minuta
Stachylina nana
Stachylina paludosa
Stachylina paucispora
Stachylina pedifer
Stachylina penetralis
Stachylina platensis
Stachylina prolifica
Stachylina queenslandiae
Stachylina reflexa
Stachylina robusta
Stachylina stenospora
Stachylina thaumaleidarum
Stachylina tianensis

References

External links

Zygomycota genera